HBK may refer to:

Football clubs 
 Halmstads BK, based in Halmstad, Sweden
 HB Køge, based in Herfølge, Køge Municipality, Denmark
 Höganäs BK, based in Höganäs, Sweden
 Hønefoss BK, based in Hønefoss, Norway

People 
 Shawn Michaels, American professional wrestler nicknamed the Heartbreak Kid, frequently shortened to HBK
 The HBK Gang, American hip hop and music production collective

Other uses 
 HBK Investments, an American investment management company
 Croatian Bishops' Conference, an episcopal conference of the Catholic Church in Croatia
 Hardback book (Hbk)
 Hochschule für Bildende Künste Braunschweig, a fine arts college in Braunschweig, Germany
 Holbrook Municipal Airport, in Arizona, United States
 Humse Badhkar Kaun, a 1998 Bollywood film
 Carl Hagelin - Nick Bonino - Phil Kessel line for the Pittsburgh Penguins